Dio vi salvi Regina (Italian for "God save you Queen") is a folk song in the culture of Corsica. The local nationalists also consider it the de facto "national anthem" of Corsica. It is customary to sing it at the end of any concert of Corsican folk music.

It was written as a religious song in Italy by Francis de Geronimo (later canonized) about 1675. It was adopted de facto as the national anthem of Corsica when it proclaimed independence from the Republic of Genoa at Orezza, on 30 January 1735.

Traditionally, a shepherd, Salvadore Costa, is credited with converting the hymn not only to a Corsican anthem, but to a rallying symbol for Corsican independence. It was first performed at the Chapel of St. Mark (San Marco) on 25 April 1720.

The anthem requests the intercessory protection of the Virgin Mary, heartily concurred in by the independence leaders. There were a few changes, such as in the second stanza from "disperati" (desperate) to "tribolati" (troubled).  The commonly used version's last stanza was an original addition, written in the Corsican language, which makes reference to victory against enemies of Corsica, as to highlight the adopted lyrics' intended use.

Lyrics

Italian text

Corsican text

See also 
 Evviva Maria

References

External links
 http://www.polyhymnion.org/lieder/images/diuvisalvi.mid Midi file of "Diu vi salvi Regina"
 http://www.polyhymnion.org/lieder/images/diuvisalvi.pdf Score-PDF file of "Diu vi salvi Regina"

French anthems
Patriotic songs
Corsican music
Historical national anthems
17th-century hymns
French Christian hymns
National anthem compositions in G minor
1675 songs